Brummell may refer to:

Beau Brummell, born George Bryan Brummell (1778–1840), arbiter of men's fashion in Regency England, friend of the future King George IV
Brummell (opera), a 1931 operetta by Reynaldo Hahn, libretto by Rip and Robert Dieudonné
Brummell Sendai, nickname of Vegalta Sendai, a Japanese professional football (soccer) club
Paul Brummell (born 1965), British diplomat

See also
Beau Brummell: This Charming Man, 2006 BBC Television drama
Beau Brummell (1954 film) (1954)
Procter and Collier-Beau Brummell Building, in Cincinnati, Ohio
Brumel (disambiguation)
Brummen
Brummer (disambiguation)